The Roman Catholic Diocese of San Roque de Presidencia Roque Sáenz Peña is located in the town of San Roque in the city of Presidencia Roque Sáenz Peña, usually referred to as simply Sáenz Peña, in the province of Chaco, Argentina.

History
On 12 August 1963, Pope Paul VI established the Diocese of Presidencia Roque Sáenz Peña from the Diocese of Resistencia.  Its name was changed to the Diocese of San Roque de Presidencia Roque Sáenz Peña on 28 February 1992 by Blessed John Paul II.

Bishops

Ordinaries
Ítalo Severino Di Stéfano (1963–1980), Appointed Archbishop of San Juan de Cuyo
Abelardo Francisco Silva (1981–1994), appointed Coadjutor Bishop of San Miguel
José Lorenzo Sartori (1994–2008)
Hugo Nicolás Barbaro (since 2008)

Auxiliary bishop
Gustavo Alejandro Montini (2014-2016), appointed Bishop of Santo Tomé

Other priests of this diocese who became bishops
Dante Carlos Sandrelli, appointed Auxiliary Bishop of Formosa
Fernando Martín Croxatto, appointed Auxiliary Bishop of Comodoro Rivadavia

References

Roman Catholic dioceses in Argentina
Roman Catholic Ecclesiastical Province of Resistencia
Christian organizations established in 1963
Roman Catholic dioceses and prelatures established in the 20th century